Tulane Review is a literary magazine published by the members of the Tulane Literary Society of Tulane University located in New Orleans, Louisiana.

History and profile
First published in 1988, the Review consists of submissions of art, poetry, and prose which are judged by members of student review boards before being selected for final publication by the editors. It accepts work from both professional and amateur writers and artists from across the world, while generally seeking to publish some work from the Tulane community whenever possible. The magazine is published twice a year in the fall and spring.

The Review is the recipient of the design award of the AWP Literary Magazine.

See also
List of literary magazines

References

External links 
 Tulane Review
 Tulane Review Archives (incomplete)

Literary magazines published in the United States
Biannual magazines published in the United States
Magazines published in Louisiana
Mass media in New Orleans
Tulane University